The Hanson Woodwind is an all-wooden homebuilt aircraft with a fiberglass wing.

Design and development
The Woodwind was a homebuilt copy of the Wittman Tailwind using all-wood construction, rather than welded steel tube and aircraft fabric covering for the fuselage. Ironically, the Wittman design uses plywood covering for its wings, while the Woodwind uses fiberglass.

The Woodwind is a two-seat side-by-side configuration, strut-braced, high-wing aircraft with conventional landing gear and Plexiglas doors. Some construction elements were adapted from the all-wood Bowers Fly Baby. The fuselage sides and tail surfaces are built flat on a table at the same time and covered with aircraft grade plywood. The wings are covered in fiberglass with stainless steel torque tubes for aileron control. The fuel tanks and cowling are also made from fiberglass. The prototype used a moose-hide interior.

Operational history
The prototype first flew on 20 June 1969. The aircraft was written off in a non-fatal accident on 5 June 1976 after hitting a large rock.

Specifications (Hanson Woodwind)

See also

References

Homebuilt aircraft